The 1983 LSU Tigers football team represented Louisiana State University (LSU) during the 1983 NCAA Division I-A football season.

Following an Orange Bowl berth and a No. 11 final ranking the previous season, LSU cratered in its fourth season under Jerry Stovall, going winless in the Southeastern Conference for the only time in program history. The Tigers ended the season with a nationally televised victory vs. Tulane on Thanksgiving night, but it was not enough to save Stovall's job. The former LSU All-American and 1962 Heisman Trophy runner-up was fired by a 13–5 vote of the LSU Board of Supervisors December 2. Stovall's career record was 22-21-2.

Three days after Stovall's firing, Miami Dolphins defensive coordinator Bill Arnsparger was named as his successor.

Schedule

Personnel

Season summary

at Tulane

References

LSU
LSU Tigers football seasons
LSU Tigers football